Mansour Al-Muwallad (born 24 January 1997) is a Saudi Arabian professional footballer who plays as a forward for Jeddah.

Honours
Al-Taawoun
King Cup: 2019

References

External links
 

1997 births
Living people
Saudi Arabian footballers
Association football forwards
Saudi Professional League players
Saudi First Division League players
Al-Ahli Saudi FC players
Al-Taawoun FC players
Damac FC players
Al-Adalah FC players
Al-Shoulla FC players
Al-Kholood Club players
Jeddah Club players
Saudi Arabia youth international footballers